is a Japanese politician serving in the House of Representatives in the Diet (national legislature) as a member of the Democratic Party of Japan. A native of Hikone, Shiga he earned his undergraduate degree in Chuo University, study-abroad credit in Carleton College in Minnesota, United States and master's degree in Doshisha University. He was elected for the first time in 2005.

References

External links
   Official website in Japanese.

Living people
1940 births
Democratic Party of Japan politicians
Members of the House of Representatives (Japan)
Chuo University alumni
Doshisha University alumni
21st-century Japanese politicians